Dreaming Lips is a 1937 British drama film directed by Paul Czinner and starring Elisabeth Bergner, Romney Brent and Raymond Massey.

Synopsis
The wife (Bergner) of a violin player (Brent) in a famous orchestra, falls in love with her husband's friend and, tragically, drowns herself.

Cast
 Elisabeth Bergner as Gaby Lawrence  
 Raymond Massey as Miguel del Vayo  
 Romney Brent as Peter Lawrence  
 Joyce Bland as Christine  
 Sydney Fairbrother as Mrs. Stanway  
 Felix Aylmer as Sir Robert Blaker  
 J. Fisher White as Dr. Wilson  
 Charles Carson as Impresario  
 Donald Calthrop as Philosopher  
 Ronald Shiner as Friend  
 Cyril Raymond as PC  
 George Carney as Rescuer  
 Bruno Barnabe as Rescuer

Production
The film was produced by Trafalgar Film Productions with art direction by Thomas N. Morahan. It was a remake of the 1932 German film Dreaming Lips also directed by Czinner and starring Bergner which had been based on the play Mélo by Henri Bernstein. In 1953 Josef von Báky remade the film in Germany, based on the original script by Czinner and Mayer.

The script would be Mayer's last, as he would die of cancer in 1944.

Reception
The film was well received by critics, but not as financially successful as had been hoped. Writing for The Spectator in 1937, Graham Greene gave the film a mixed review, describing it as "a shapely piece of sentiment" with a story "neat and plausible, the acting refined, the photography expensive". Greene, however, complains that its "sumptuous gloss[iness]" loses authenticity and that "there is nothing to remember when the night's over".

References

External links
 
 
 

1937 films
1937 drama films
British drama films
Films directed by Paul Czinner
Films with screenplays by Carl Mayer
Films scored by William Walton
British black-and-white films
British remakes of German films
Films shot at Denham Film Studios
British films based on plays
Films about violins and violinists
1930s English-language films
1930s British films